Aston Hill Bike Park is located adjacent to Wendover Woods on the ridge of the Chiltern Hills, above Aston Clinton, Buckinghamshire. 

It is managed by Forestry England and the Community Interest Company (CIC) Chiltern Hills Bikepark. 

Aston Hill is a challenging venue, better suited to intermediate and expert riders when dry and more experienced riders when wet. There are downhill (DH) cross country (XC) and four-cross (4X) mountain bike trails. The downhill trails are the Red Run (which is part of the XC loop) the Black Run, Ricochet, Root Canal and Surface to Air freeride trail.

Aston Hill hosts various events throughout the year, like the "Firecrest MTB Adult Rider Development Programme".

Aston Hill is now open every day of the week with the Forestry England rangers taking responsibility for opening and locking the gate, mirroring the opening hours of Wendover Woods and closing half an hour before them.

Aston Martin 
The Aston Martin plaque is to the left of the car park.

External links
Wendover Woods
Aston Hill

Mountain biking venues in the United Kingdom
Cycleways in England
Chiltern Hills